The One account is  a secured personal bank account with The Royal Bank of Scotland plc offering offset and flexible mortgages in the UK.

History
The company pioneered the offset mortgage in the UK and; was conceived as a joint venture between Virgin Direct (Virgin's financial services company) and The Royal Bank of Scotland in 1997.

Initially, the company was known as the 'Virgin One account' and promoted to Virgin Direct's 200,000 strong UK customer base. The launch was very successful and was extended to the entire British public in May 1998.

From January 2003, the company relaunched as 'The One account' when The Royal Bank of Scotland took a majority shareholding, becoming an RBS mortgage brand along with NatWest and First Active.

The One account is operated directly by phone, internet and post, with the customer service originally being provided on a 24/365 basis, but now reduced to a weekday and Saturday peak hour service.

Distribution
As well as being sold directly by phone, internet and post, One Account products were distributed through intermediaries - mortgage brokers and independent financial advisers. The account is no longer available to new customers.

Current account mortgages 
The type of offset products offered by The One account are called current account mortgages (CAM). As the name suggests, customers consolidate the balances of their mortgage, traditional current accounts, personal loans and, if desired, their saving accounts into one account.

A low, mortgage-style interest rate is charged on the net balance of the account on a daily basis. Since customers pay their salary into the account this money has the effect of reducing the average balance and, therefore the interest paid when compared with a traditional mortgage. The interest rate used to vary with the Bank of England base rate, however in recent months the One Account interest rate has not decreased along with the bank rate. In June 2008, customers were informed that their mortgage rates would increase by 0.25% to reflect 'current market conditions' although the Bank of England rate had not increased.

References

External links 

Royal Bank of Scotland
Banks of the United Kingdom
Banks established in 1997